The Patriot Athletic Conference (PAC-12) was an Ohio high school athletic league made up of 12 schools from around the Cleveland area that existed from 2005-2006 to the 2018-2019 school year.  All member schools were also members of the Ohio High School Athletic Association.

Members
The following were members over the league's tenure:

League history
The league was formed in 2005 from members of the Mohican Area Conference (Black River and Buckeye), the Lorain County Conference (Brookside, Clearview, Keystone, Oberlin, and Wellington), and the Metropolitan Area Conference (Brooklyn, Columbia, and Lutheran West).  Firelands and Fairview joined in 2011.

In 2017, the eight primarily Lorain County schools (Brookside, Clearview, Columbia, Firelands, Keystone, Oberlin, and Wellington, as well as Black River) announced they would leave the PAC in 2020 to form their own league.

In response to the league's imminent dissolution, Brooklyn and Lutheran West were accepted by a league-wide vote in April 2018 to join the Chagrin Valley Conference in 2019-20.

In May 2018, Buckeye and Fairview were approved to join the Great Lakes Conference for the 2019-20 school year as their eighth and ninth members.

The new league with the eight predominantly Lorain County schools would choose the name of Lorain County League and began league play with the 2019-20 school year.

See also
Ohio high school athletic conferences
Ohio High School Athletic Association

References

External links
Patriot Athletic Conference - Official Site
Fit for a Pirate?

Ohio high school sports conferences